Beloved is a 2011 French romantic drama film written and directed by Christophe Honoré, starring Chiara Mastroianni, Catherine Deneuve, Ludivine Sagnier, Louis Garrel, Radivoje Bukvic, Paul Schneider, and Michel Delpech. The story is set in the 1960s through the 2000s in Paris, Reims, Montreal, Prague and London. While not a musical, the characters use musical 'narration' and 'dialogues' throughout the film.

Plot
In the 1960s, Madeline marries Jaromil and gives birth to their daughter Véra. Thirty years later, Véra falls in love with a musician Henderson.

Cast

Production
The film is produced by Why Not Productions. The project received 228,000 euro in support from the Ile-de-France Regional Support Fund for Technical Film and Audiovisual Industries. Apart from the French investment, 20% of the 6.8-million-euro budget came from the United Kingdom and 10% from the Czech Republic. Filming started on 18 October 2010.

Release
The film had its world premiere as the closing film of the 2011 Cannes Film Festival on 22 May 2011. It was released in France through Le Pacte on 17 August 2011. It was also screened at the 2011 Toronto International Film Festival on 11 September 2011.

Reception
At Rotten Tomatoes, the film holds an approval rating of 56% based on 45 reviews, and an average rating of 5.83/10. At Metacritic, which assigns a normalized rating to reviews, the film has a weighted average score of 55 out of 100, based on 17 critics, indicating "mixed or average reviews".

Peter Bradshaw of The Guardian gave the film 3 out of 5 stars, writing, "The movie is at its lightest, most charming and most persuasive in the 60s; as it approaches the present, something inescapably preposterous weighs it down, though Honoré carries it off with some flair." Sheri Linden of Los Angeles Times wrote, "In the central roles, real-life mother and daughter Catherine Deneuve and Chiara Mastroianni bring a chemical spark to the onscreen dynamics, and their compelling performances anchor the story's novelistic sprawl, especially when it falters or loses focus." She added, "The story lines are thin, but the melancholy that Honoré and his cast tap into is vibrant, particularly in Deneuve's portrayal of a woman who has embraced romantic daring and can observe her younger self without regret." Alison Willmore of The A.V. Club gave the film a grade of B, calling it "rambling, messy, but ultimately charming". Kirk Honeycutt of The Hollywood Reporter commented that "Location work everywhere is top notch and the smart decision was made not to turn this into a fashion parade through the decades but rather to go for a timeless look in the clothes, furniture and décor."

References

External links
 

2011 films
Czech romantic drama films
2010s Czech-language films
2010s French-language films
2011 romantic drama films
French romantic drama films
British romantic drama films
Films directed by Christophe Honoré
Films set in London
Films set in Paris
Films set in Prague
Films shot in Paris
Films shot in London
Films shot in Montreal
Films shot in the Czech Republic
2010s English-language films
2010s British films
2010s French films